Afton is an unincorporated community in Glenn County, California. A general store was operated for many years at Afton but closed down in recent years. Afton is primarily an agricultural community. The area is known for flooding during winters with high rainfall.

A post office operated at Afton from 1887 to 1910 and from 1915 to 1923.

References

Unincorporated communities in California
Unincorporated communities in Glenn County, California